David Kaye is a Canadian voice actor. He is best known for animation roles such as Megatron in five of the Transformers series (Beast Wars, Beast Machines, Armada, Energon, and Cybertron), Optimus Prime in Transformers: Animated, Professor X, Jamie Madrox and Apocalypse in X-Men: Evolution, Cronus in Class of the Titans, Khyber and Shocksquatch in Ben 10: Omniverse, several characters in Avengers Assemble, the newsreel announcer in the Pixar film Up, and Duckworth in the reboot of DuckTales. He is also known for anime roles including Sesshōmaru in Inuyasha and Treize Khushrenada in Mobile Suit Gundam Wing, and video game roles such as Clank in the Ratchet & Clank series and Nathan Hale in the Resistance series. He is also the announcer for Last Week Tonight with John Oliver on HBO and voiced the Celestial Arishem in the Marvel Cinematic Universe film Eternals.

Early life
During the 1980s, Kaye moved to Vancouver to work in radio. He also did theater, playing George in a production of Who's Afraid of Virginia Woolf and Elwood P. Dowd in a production of Harvey.

Career
Kaye's voice acting career began in 1989 with General Hawk in the DiC animated series G.I. Joe. Working as an on-air talent for radio station CKLG (LG73), he quickly became less interested as both on-camera and voice roles started taking up more of his time. On-camera opportunities came in the form of guest roles on TV series and movies such as The X-Files, Battlestar Galactica, and Happy Gilmore. During this time, he was cast in several animation shows and video games, including a role as Megatron in Beast Wars. This began a decades-long relationship with the Transformers franchise. In 2007, Kaye become the first and (as of 2021) only actor in the franchise to play both Megatron and Optimus Prime in regular roles, voicing the latter for Cartoon Network's Transformers: Animated. He also lent his voice to the later series Transformers: Prime and Transformers: Robots in Disguise.

In anime, Kaye has been the voice behind Sesshomaru in the English dubbed InuYasha series, Treize Khushrenada in Mobile Suit Gundam Wing, Recoome in Dragon Ball Z (1996–98) and as Soun Tendo in Ranma ½. His involvement in anime has led to several appearances at conventions. Kaye later moved to Los Angeles and has since worked on Ben 10: Omniverse as the villain Khyber, on Regular Show as Reginald, and on Xiaolin Chronicles as Clay Bailey, F-Bot, and Chase Young. He has voiced several characters on the Avengers Assemble animated series and Max Tennyson in the reboot of Ben 10. He shared the role of the Stretch Monster with Miguel Ferrer in Stretch Armstrong and the Flex Fighters, and also took over in the late actor's role of Vandal Savage in Young Justice: Outsiders.

Kaye also narrates film trailers and network promos for ABC, Fox, The CW, National Geographic, TLC, FX, and others.

Personal life
Kaye and his wife, Maria Hope, have a daughter named Tianna.

Filmography

Animation

 Avengers Assemble – Vision, J.A.R.V.I.S., Helmut Zemo / Citizen V, Space Phantom, Blood Brother #1, Iron Legion, Ultron, Roxxon Guard #1, Corvus Glaive, Heinrich Zemo, Guardsman, Additional voices
 The Avengers: Earth's Mightiest Heroes – Supreme Intelligence
 Be Cool, Scooby-Doo! – Headless Count, Bradwick 
 Beast Machines: Transformers – Megatron
 Beast Wars: Transformers – Megatron
 Being Ian – Jousting Tournament Announcer, Chopin 
 Ben 10 – Max Tennyson, Shock Rock, Humungousaur, Fisherman, Steve, Trucker, Spider, Shock-O, Boxer, Clown #2, Lester, Guard, Mr, Billions, Tour Guide (2nd Time), Melvin, Lagrange, Lord Decibel, Karl, Azmuth
 Ben 10/Generator Rex: Heroes United – Shocksquatch 
 Ben 10: Omniverse – Khyber, Cannonbolt, Shocksquatch, Gravattack, Heatblast, Sunder, Frankenstrike, Mallice, Warlord Gar, Ultimate Gravattack, Thumbskull, Forever King, Joseph Chadwick (2nd Time), Lord Transyl, Deefus Veeblepister, Unitaur, Slapstrike, Exo-Skull, Skurd
 Class of the Titans – Cronus
 Coconut Fred's Fruit Salad Island – Bunga Berry, Additional Voices
 D'Myna Leagues – Barry
 Dan Vs. – Various characters
 DC Nation Shorts: Shazam – Shazam, Ibac
 DC Nation Shorts: Tales of Metropolis – Bizarro 
 DuckTales – Duckworth, Rhutt Betlam
 Electric City – Dr. Loman
 Exosquad – General Draconis, Lt. Hallas 
 Fantastic Four: World's Greatest Heroes – Iron Man (Ep. "Shell Games")
 Fat Dog Mendoza – Cry Baby Cry Announcer, Superboots Spokesperson, Pterodactyl, Big Al
 Generation O! – Fred Topple
 G.I. Joe – General Hawk (season 2) 
 G.I. Joe: Renegades – Narrator (uncredited), Patrick O'Hara
 Gadget and the Gadgetinis – Additional Voices (uncredited)
 GeoTrax – Tex/Sir John
 Geronimo Stilton – Chippy P. Crunchrat
 Green Eggs and Ham – Various characters
 Guardians of the Galaxy – Corvus Glaive
 Hot Wheels Battle Force 5 – Kromulax
 Hurricanes – Narrator
 Jackie Chan Adventures – Elvin Elf, Santa Claus
 Kleo the Misfit Unicorn – Slim, Various
 Kong: The Animated Series – Professor Ramon De la Porta,News Anchor (in "The Giant Robberies") & Lex (in "Dragon Fire").
 Mummies Alive! – Talos
 NASCAR Racers – Various characters
 ReBoot – Head Spectral (Ep. "Where No Sprite Has Gone Before")
 Regular Show –  Various characters
 Rescue Heroes – Rock Miner
 RoboCop: Alpha Commando – Various characters
 Robot Chicken – Megatron, Invisible Man, 8-bit Blacksmith
 Roswell Conspiracies: Aliens, Myths and Legends – Various characters
 Scooby-Doo! Mystery Incorporated – Argus Fentonpoof, Dr. Phobos, Bill Buntman
 Skysurfer Strike Force – Jack Hollister / Skysurfer One (season 2)
 Star Wars: The Clone Wars - General Tandin, Citizen and Rebel
 The Story of Christmas - Joseph
 Street Fighter - Akuma
 Street Sharks - Dr. Robert Bolton 
 Stretch Armstrong and the Flex Fighters - Stretch Monster and Epsilon Interviewer
 Stroker and Hoop - Ansel, Announcer 
 Tales from the Unknown - Moltar, Shock Rock, Humungousaur
 Teen Titans Go! - Death, Ferryman, Whimsy Robin, Whimsy Cyborg, Buster and Dragon
 The Cramp Twins - News Anchor and Man (Ep. "News Whale/Twisted Ending")
 The Wacky World of Tex Avery – Narrator 
 Tom and Jerry Tales - Mauricio (Ep. "Tiger Cat/Feeding Time/Polar Peril")
 Transformers: Animated - Optimus Prime, Grimlock, Lugnut, Cliffjumper, Warpath, Highbrow, Sparkplug Witwicky
 Transformers: Prime – Hardshell, Vehicon Trooper #1
 Transformers: Robots in Disguise – Hammerstrike, Slashmark, Race Announcer (Ep. 55)
 The Twisted Whiskers Show – Dander, Claude, Dash, Fishmonger 
 Ultimate Spider-Man – J.A.R.V.I.S. (Ep. "The Avenging Spider-Man: Part 1")
 Walter Melon – Alien Father and NASA Reporter
 We Bare Bears – Various characters
 Xiaolin Chronicles - Clay Bailey, Chase Young and F-Bot
 X-Men: Evolution - Charles Xavier / Professor X and En Sabah Nur / Apocalypse
 Yakkity Yak – Additional Voices 
 Young Justice – Vandal Savage, Elongated Man, Steve Lombard, Arion and Kirby Jacobs 
 Yvon of the Yukon - Several other characters

Anime dubbing

 Dragon Ball Z – Recoome (Ocean dub)
 Eat-Man '98 – Bolt Crank
 Fatal Fury 2: The New Battle – Kim Kaphwan
 Ghost in the Shell: Stand Alone Complex OVAs – Batou
 Hello Carbot — Hawk
 Inuyasha – Sesshōmaru (1st voice, also movies), Unnamed samurai (oni women), Gakusanjin, O-Yakata's guard, Mimisenri, Unnamed elderly village (Suikotsu's village)
 Key the Metal Idol – Tomoyo Wakagi
 Maison Ikkoku – Soichiro Otonashi
 MegaMan NT Warrior – ProtoMan.EXE
 Mobile Suit Gundam Wing – Treize Khushrenada
 Monster Rancher – Monol, Captain Clay, Celius, End Bringer, Moo
 Night Warriors: Darkstalkers' Revenge – Pyron
 Ranma ½ – Soun Tendo, The Gambling King, Daisuke, Additional Voices
 Ronin Warriors – The Ancient One, Narrator
 Tico of the Seven Seas – James
 Tokyo Underground – Pairon, Narrator
 Transformers: Armada – Megatron / Galvatron
 Transformers: Energon – Megatron / Galvatron
 Transformers: Cybertron – Megatron / Galvatron
 Yashahime: Princess Half-Demon - Sesshōmaru (Episodes 15, 18, 21-25, 27-31, 35-40, 45-48)

Film

 Adventures of Mowgli – Akela (English dub)
 Barbie and the Three Musketeers – Alexander
 Barbie as Rapunzel – Hugo
 Barbie in Princess Power – Wes Rivers
 Barbie: Mariposa – Royal Guard
 Broken Saints – Lear Dunham
 Casper's Haunted Christmas – Narrator
 DC Showcase: Blue Beetle – Question
 Fatal Fury: The Motion Picture – Kim Kaphwan
 Hot Wheels AcceleRacers – Deezel "Porkchop" Riggs
 Iron Man & Captain America: Heroes United – J.A.R.V.I.S., Computer Voice #1
 Iron Man & Hulk: Heroes United – J.A.R.V.I.S.
 Jin-Roh: The Wolf Brigade – Additional Voices
 Inuyasha the Movie: Affections Touching Across Time – Sesshōmaru
 Inuyasha the Movie: Swords of an Honorable Ruler – Sesshōmaru
 Inuyasha the Movie: Fire on the Mystic Island – Sesshōmaru
 Night of the Living Carrots – The Missing Link
 Planet Hulk – Additional Voices
 Ratchet & Clank – Clank
 Rudolph the Red-Nosed Reindeer: The Movie – Cupid
 Scooby-Doo! and the Beach Beastie – Grafton Brownstone
 Scooby-Doo! and the Gourmet Ghost – Henry Metcalf, Chef Edward DuFlay
 Teen Titans: The Judas Contract – Additional Voices
 The Ant Bully –  Sleeping Ant #2, Wrangler Ant, Guard Ant #3
 The Hero of Color City – Black, King Scrawl
 Up – Newsreel Announcer
 Doraemon: Nobita and the New Steel Troops—Winged Angels – Pippo

Video games

 Assassin's Creed II – Additional Voices
 Assassin's Creed: Brotherhood – Salai (Da Vinci's Disappearance DLC)
 Baldur's Gate: Dark Alliance II
 Batman: Arkham City – James Gordon
 Beetle Adventure Racing – Game Announcer
 Ben 10: Omniverse – Cannonbolt, Gravattack, Heatblast, Khyber, Shocksquatch, Arachdroid
 Ben 10: Omniverse 2 – Cannonbolt, Gravattack, Incursean Frog Commando, Swampfire
 Call of Duty: Advanced Warfare – Additional Cast
 Dead Island – Logan Carter
 Dead Island: Riptide – Logan Carter 
 Dragalia Lost – Sha Wujing 
 Disney Infinity 3.0 – J.A.R.V.I.S., Mysterio
 Doom 3 – Additional VO
 Doom 3: Resurrection of Evil – Additional VO
 Hot Shots Golf Fore! – Clank
 Fuse – Oculus
 Impossible Creatures – Upton Julius
 Inuyasha: Feudal Combat – Sesshomaru (English version)
 Kessen – Narrator (English version)
 Kingdom Hearts III – Olympus Narrator (English version)
 Lost: Via Domus – John Locke
 Marvel Nemesis: Rise of the Imperfects – Iron Man
 Marvel: Ultimate Alliance 2 – Captain America, Colonel Nick Fury
 Marvel Ultimate Alliance 3: The Black Order – Corvus Glaive, Mysterio, Vision
 Marvel vs. Capcom: Infinite – Jedah Dohma (English version)
 Matt Hazard: Blood Bath and Beyond – Matt Hazard
 Mobile Suit Gundam: Encounters in Space – Random Pilots
 Monsters vs. Aliens – Additional Voices
 Need for Speed series – Game Announcer
 Nickelodeon All-Star Brawl – Powdered Toast Man (voiceover added in the June 2022 update)
 Nickelodeon Kart Racers 3: Slime Speedway - Powdered Toast Man
 Overstrike – Dalton Brooks (Trailer)
 PlayStation All-Stars Battle Royale – Clank
 PlayStation Move Heroes – Clank
 Psychonauts – Ford Cruller
 Psychonauts 2 – Ford Cruller
 Ratchet & Clank series – Clank, Klunk, Additional Performers
 Resistance series – Nathan Hale
 Spider-Man: Friend or Foe – Electro
 Spider-Man: Shattered Dimensions – Mysterio
 Star Ocean: The Divine Force – Remington Kurtzman
 Star Wars: The Old Republic – Additional Voices
 Super Bomberman R – Clank (PlayStation 4 version)
 The Cave – Magician, Weight Guesser, Roulette Barker
 The Wolf Among Us – Dr. Swineheart
 Tom Clancy's Splinter Cell: Pandora Tomorrow – Suhadi Sadono
 Transformers – Megatron
 Transformers Animated: The Game – Optimus Prime, Lugnut

Other
 BBC Radio 1 – Announcer for coverage of the 2007 Miami Winter Music Conference
 I Know That Voice – Himself

Live-action
 Battlestar Galactica – James McManus
 Carpool – Scott Lewis
 Death Note – Koreyoshi Kitamura (voice, English dub)
 Edge of Tomorrow – UDF Commercial (voice)
 Eternals – Arishem the Judge (voice)
 Happy Gilmore – Reporter
 Last Week Tonight with John Oliver – Announcer (voice)
 Martian Child – Andy
 The Quest – Narrator (voice)
 The X-Files – (2 episodes)
 X2: X-Men United – TV Host (uncredited)

References

External links

 
 
 
 Interview with David Kaye – Jan 2004

20th-century Canadian male actors
21st-century Canadian male actors
Living people
Audiobook narrators
Canadian expatriates in the United States
Canadian male film actors
Canadian male radio actors
Canadian male stage actors
Canadian male television actors
Canadian male video game actors
Canadian male voice actors
Last Week Tonight with John Oliver
Year of birth missing (living people)